Celia Corres Giner (born 22 January 1964) is a former field hockey player from Spain, who was a member of the Women's National Team that won the gold medal at the 1992 Summer Olympics on home soil (Barcelona).

References

External links
 
 
 
 

1964 births
Living people
Sportspeople from Terrassa
Spanish female field hockey players
Field hockey players from Catalonia
Olympic field hockey players of Spain
Field hockey players at the 1992 Summer Olympics
Olympic gold medalists for Spain
Olympic medalists in field hockey
Medalists at the 1992 Summer Olympics
Atlètic Terrassa players
20th-century Spanish women